Edward Gerald Byrne   (23 July 1912 – 14 May 2003) was a New Brunswick lawyer and politician, who was made King's Counsel and Member of the Order of Canada.

Biography

Byrne was born to medical doctor Thomas Ives and Rita Ross in Chatham, New Brunswick on 23 July 1912.

Already a practicing lawyer, Byrne rose to the rank of Flight Commander in the RCAF during his two years' service in the Second World War. Later, on 27 June 1946, he married another veteran, Ruth Ann Corr. For one year prior to his election in 1949 as Mayor of Bathurst, Byrne was President of his local chapter of the Rotary Club.

Byrne appeared in many, if not most, of the important trials that related to business in Gloucester County during his 34-year career there.

Byrne chaired the New Brunswick Royal Commission on Finance and Municipal Taxation whose 1,000-page report, tabled in November 1963, was instrumental in the development of l'Université de Moncton, and led to the adoption of the province's Equal Opportunity Programme, which revolutionised the financial and social policies of the province:

When the Byrne Commission was established in 1962, three New Brunswick counties were on the brink of bankruptcy. The Byrne report provided for equalization grants to municipalities that could not afford to provide a standard level of service.

Premier Bernard Lord said in his condolences that:

An earlier writer considered the Report and Programme as hauling

Byrne was at one point or another appointed a director of the Bank of Canada, Consolidated Bathurst Pulp and Paper Ltd., Gotaas Larsen Shipping, Brunswick Mines and Noranda, among others.

Byrne was recognized by the Ecole de Sacre Coeur, Bathurst, St. Thomas University, St. Francis Xavier University, University of New Brunswick and Dalhousie University, which all awarded him Doctor Honoris Causa. 

Byrne passed away in Halifax, Nova Scotia on 14 May 2003 at 90 years of age. A Roman Catholic, he was predeceased by his wife of 55 years, Ruth Ann Corr, and survived by his twins, Joseph Ross and Anne.

Elimination of tax concessions in New Brunswick

Buried in the Byrne Commission report was a recommendation to abolish municipal tax concessions. Section 3 of Bill 118, which was to become the Assessment Act, read:

This sparked many lawsuits, including some that went to the Supreme Court of Canada, over what was meant by "real estate property": see Bathurst Paper Limited v. Minister of Municipal Affairs of NB (1971), Minister of Municipal Affairs (N.B.) v Canaport Ltd (1975) and Irving Oil Co v Minister of Municipal Affairs of NB (1975).

Notes

Bibliography
 

1912 births
2003 deaths
Mayors of places in New Brunswick
Lawyers in New Brunswick
Canadian King's Counsel
20th-century Canadian lawyers
Members of the Order of Canada